Phyllidia guamensis is a species of sea slug, a dorid nudibranch, a shell-less marine gastropod mollusk in the family Phyllidiidae.

Distribution 
This rare species was described from Guam. It has been reported from the Northern Mariana Islands and the Marquesas Islands.

Description
This nudibranch has a black dorsum with large yellow-capped tubercles surrounded by pale blue rings. Towards the edge of the mantle these tubercles become small and increasingly numerous, without any yellow caps. The rhinophores are yellow.

Diet
This species feeds on a sponge.

References

Phyllidiidae
Gastropods described in 1993